Caesar and Otto's Deadly Xmas is a 2012 American comedy-horror film. It stars Dave Campfield, Paul Chomicki, Felissa Rose, Deron Miller, Lloyd Kaufman, Linnea Quigley, Joe Estevez, Debbie Rochon, Brinke Stevens, Ken Macfarlane, and Avi K. Garg, as well as a cameo appearance by Robert Z'Dar. It is written and directed by Dave Campfield, the creator of the original Caesar and Otto film. The story is by Campfield and co-producer Joe Randazzo.

Release
The fifth in Campfield's Caesar and Otto series, the film premiered at the 2012 "Fright Night Film Fest" in Louisville, Kentucky on June 30, 2012. The film has gone on to receive awards and nominations at several film festivals.

The film was picked up for North American DVD distribution by "Wild Eye Releasing" and was released on November 19, 2013.

Reception
Bloody Disgusting said, "it’s not bad and it’s not that great either – but for that sub sub sub sub genre it lies within, it is probably better than the majority of films it is surrounded by."

HorrorHound magazine stated in their issue 39 review of the film that "the budget is obviously low, but the filmmaking is brilliant."

References

Series
 Caesar and Otto (2007)
 Caesar and Otto's Summer Camp Massacre (2009)
 Caesar and Otto in the House of Dracula (2009)
 Caesar and Otto meet Dracula's Lawyer (2010)
 Caesar and Otto's Deadly Christmas (2012)
 Caesar and Otto's Paranormal Halloween (2015)

External links
 
  Review of the film from Ain't It Cool News
  Review of the film from HorrorNews.net

2012 films
American comedy horror films
2010s Christmas horror films
2012 comedy horror films
American Christmas horror films
2010s English-language films
2010s American films